Sagron Mis (Sagrón in local dialect) is a comune (municipality) in Trentino in the northern Italian region Trentino-Alto Adige/Südtirol, located about  east of Trento.

The municipality of Sagron Mis contains the frazioni (subdivisions, mainly villages and hamlets) Matiuz, Pante (Penns) and Vori.

Sagron Mis borders the following municipalities: Gosaldo, Cesiomaggiore, Tonadico and Transacqua.

Demographic evolution

References

Cities and towns in Trentino-Alto Adige/Südtirol